E18 Album is the debut album by the band Detektivbyrån released by the Japanese label P-Vine under license from the band's own label Danarkia. It may also be viewed as a compilation album as it mainly contains all the songs from the EP Hemvägen and the single "Lyckans Undulat". Also included on the album is the song "Laka-Koffa", previously released in May 2007 on a limited 500 copies 7" vinyl single "Detektivbyrån - Hemstad" accompanied by the song "Tuff Ungdom" by Hemstad. The song "Home Sweet Home", which is a variant of "Hem Ljuva Hem", was previously unreleased.

The album name E18 Album is a likely homage to the European route E18 that passes through the city of Karlstad, Värmland where the band members grew up.

Track listing
 "E18" - 3:29
 "Hemvägen" - 4:03
 "Nattöppet" - 3:20
 "Monster" - 2:49
 "Dansbanan" - 3:49
 "Granmon" - 2:19
 "Vänerhavet" - 4:06
 "Lyckans Undulat" - 2:52
 "Hem Ljuva Hem" - 2:15
 "Home Sweet Home" - 1:23
 "Laka-Koffa" - 6:14

References

2008 debut albums
Detektivbyrån albums